Vittaryd is a locality situated in Ljungby Municipality, Kronoberg County, Sweden with 318 inhabitants in 2010.

Several of the older houses in the centre of the village predate the industrialisation of Europe.   Currently, however, economic activity is concentrated on manufacturing, with a house door factory and a car parts plant as the two largest employers.

References 

Populated places in Kronoberg County
Populated places in Ljungby Municipality
Finnveden